Luotian County is a county that is located in the northeast of Hubei province, China and it is under the administration of Huanggang City. The county is on the south side of the Dabie Mountains with the highest peak, Tiantangzhai, situated in the northeastern part of the county. The Dabie Mountains attract thousands of tourists from all over the province every year and the most popular tourist sites include Tiantangzhai National Forest Park, Bodaofeng National Forest Park, and Sanlifan Hot Spring.

Geography

Luotian is located in the northeast of Hubei Province and it is separated from Anhui Province by the Dabie mountains in the north. Most of its area is mountainous and 70% of the land is covered by forests. Five rivers originate from the Dabie mountains and flow to the southwest. They converge into the Ba River and then into the Yangtze River.

Luotian County has a subtropical monsoon climate with wet winters and rainy summers. The average annual temperature is about 16.4 ℃ and the average annual rainfall of the county is 1330 mm. Luotian is rich in water resources with several reservoirs such as: Tiantang reservoir in the north and Bailian reservoir in the south of the county. 

The neighboring counties are: Yingshan County to the east, Xishui County to the south, Tuanfeng County to the west and Ma Cheng to the northwest.

Administrative divisions
Luotian County administers:

Climate

History
In the year of 523, (Southern and Northern dynasties of China), Luotian County was first founded in the Liang dynasty.

In 621, (Tang dynasty) the county was incorporated into Lan Xi County.

In 1093, (Song dynasty) Luotian County was refounded and belonged to Qichun prefecture.

During the Yuan dynasty, the county was occupied by Mongolia and revoked. Later it was re-established in 1275.

During the Ming dynasty, the jurisdiction of the county was changed from Qichun to Huangzhou prefecture.

During the Qing dynasty, the county is under the administration of Huangzhou prefecture.

During the Republic of China, Luotian is under the administration of Eastern Hubei prefecture.

In March 1949, the county was liberated and since then under the administration of Huanggang prefecture.

In 1995, the Huanggang prefecture was changed into prefecture-level city.

Economy

The main industry of Luotian County is agriculture and it is well known for its production of chestnut and persimmon. According to a national report on chestnut plantation, Luotian produced 65,000 tonnes of chestnuts in the year of 2013 and it was considered as the biggest producer of chestnuts in China. The annual production of chestnut in Luotian is worth about 500 million RMB. 

Other industries of Luotian include pharmaceuticals, food processing, electrical machinery, auto parts manufacturing, production of fertilizers and tourism. It is necessary to indicate that tourist industry in Luotian has been developing very fast in recent years and the most popular tourist sites include: Tiantangzhai National Forest Park, Bodaofeng National Forest Park, Sanlifan Hot Spring and Jinshi River Rafting, etc.

The mount of Tiantangzhai (1729m) is located in the town of Jiuzihe and it is one of the highest peaks in the Dabie Mountains. People enjoy a very broad and beautiful view from the top of the mountain. The temperature in Tiantangzhai during summer stays around 25 degree Celsius and that is 10 degree lower than in Huanggang or Wuhan. The forest and the comfortable weather in Tiantangzhai attracts thousands of tourists from all over the province every year. Visitors have a wide range of things to do in Tiantangzhai, for example: climbing, hiking, camping, fishing and boating in the Tiantang Lake, exploring the remote villages in the mountains, etc. 

In addition to Tiantangzhai, the hot spring in the town of Sanlifan has become a major attraction. Sanlifan has produced geothermal energy and mineral water of high quality for more than 150 years and the temperature of the hot spring may reach 90 degree Celsius. The spring of Sanlifan contains a variety of trace elements beneficial to the human body, such as zinc, strontium, metasilicic acid and so on.

Transportation
Although in a mountainous area, transportation of Luotian is good, with numerous roads and highways.
China National Highway 318
The Wuhan-Yingshan highway links Luotian to Wuhan, the provincial capital in about 2 hours and Wuhan airport is 110 kilometers to the west. 
For the north–south transportation, Macheng-Wuxue highway.

Notable inhabitants
Xu Shouhui (1320–1360) who was a rebel leader in the late Yuan dynasty (1279–1368) who proclaimed himself emperor.
Wan Mizhai (1499–1582), was a famous doctor in the Ming dynasty.
Yu Sansheng (1802–1866), one of the founders of the Peking opera.

References

 Luotian website (Chinese)
 news.cnhubei.com
 mafengwo.cn
 club.autohome.com.cn

External links

Huanggang
Counties of Hubei